Princess Sophie Friederike Dorothea Henriette of Thurn and Taxis, full German name: Sophie Friederike Dorothea Henriette, Prinzessin von Thurn und Taxis (20 July 1758 – 31 May 1800) was a member of the House of Thurn and Taxis and a Princess of Thurn and Taxis by birth and a member of the House of Radziwiłł and Princess Radziwiłł through her marriage to Prince Hieronim Wincenty Radziwiłł. Sophie Friederike was briefly a member of the Kazanowski and Ostroróg Polish noble families through subsequent marriages. She was known as "the Jewel of Regensburg."

Family
Sophie Friederike was the second child and daughter of Karl Anselm, 4th Prince of Thurn and Taxis and his wife Duchess Auguste of Württemberg. She was an elder sister of Karl Alexander, 5th Prince of Thurn and Taxis.

Marriage and issue
Sophie Friederike married Prince Hieronim Wincenty Radziwiłł, son of Michał Kazimierz "Rybeńko" Radziwiłł and his wife Anna Luiza Mycielska, on 31 December 1775 in Regensburg, Free Imperial City of Regensburg, Holy Roman Empire. Sophie Friederike and Hieronim Wincenty had one son:

Prince Dominik Hieronim Radziwiłł (4 August 1786 – 11 November 1813)

Sophie Friederike married for a second time to Prince Andrzej Kazanowski around 1795 and for a third time to Count Mikołaj Ostroróg around 1797.

Ancestry

References

1758 births
1800 deaths
People from Regensburg
Princesses of Thurn und Taxis
Radziwiłł family
Kazanowski family
Ostroróg family
German Roman Catholics